Spirited is a 2022 American Christmas musical comedy film directed by Sean Anders, and written and produced by Anders and John Morris. It is a modern retelling of Charles Dickens's 1843 novella A Christmas Carol and a satire of the various adaptations since. The film stars Will Ferrell, Ryan Reynolds, Octavia Spencer, Sunita Mani, Patrick Page, Marlow Barkley, and Tracy Morgan. In the film, The Ghost of Christmas Present is nearing retirement, which would mean a return to Earth. He sets his sights on an "unredeemable" man named Clint Briggs, who ends up helping the Ghost come to terms with his own past.

Spirited was released in select cinemas on November 11, 2022, before its streaming release on November 18, 2022, by Apple TV+. The film received positive reviews from critics, who praised its original songs and the performances and chemistry of Ferrell and Reynolds, but was criticized for its lack of improvement over previous adaptations of the novella.

Plot

For nearly two centuries, Jacob Marley and the Ghosts of Christmas Past, Present and Yet-to-Come, have led a team of afterlife spirits in helping find and redeem one new human soul or “perp” every Christmas ("That Christmas Morning Feelin'"). Christmas Present has been eligible for "retirement" for decades but refuses to do so, despite being tempted by the promise of settling down and making up for his own failures in his past life ("Present's Lament").

Scoping for a new soul to redeem, the spirits encounter Clint Briggs, a renowned, controversial media consultant ("Bringin' Back Christmas"). Despite Marley's insistence that Briggs is an "unredeemable" soul, Present is set on him, as he believes that Clint's redemption could have a “ripple” effect and make him a force for positive change in humanity. The Ghosts begin a year of research on Clint, preparing for the annual haunt ("Ripple").
 
As Christmas approaches, the Ghosts visit Clint's headquarters, where they witness him instructing his niece Wren, who is running for class president, to tank her grades and post an unflattering video of Joshua, an opposing classmate. Clint’s assistant Kimberly, who uncovered the video at his instruction, is riddled with guilt and almost quits, but ultimately doesn't ("The View from Here"). Matters are further complicated when Kimberly is unexpectedly able to see Present, who finds himself attracted to her. The haunt starts, but it quickly goes off the rails when Clint repeatedly interrupts Marley ("The Story of Your Life (Marley's Haunt)") and then seduces the willing Past, forcing Present to step in and take over her role.

Clint is dismissive of Present and resists his past memories, particularly those of his ex-girlfriend Nora, who broke up with him over his selfishness, and of his older sister Carrie, who asked Clint to raise her daughter Wren while on her deathbed. Realizing that Clint's case requires an unconventional approach, Present takes Clint back into his own past, where Present reveals that he was once Ebenezer Scrooge, the only other unredeemable soul to go through the program ("Good Afternoon"). Marley is furious and orders Present to "stick to the script" in finishing Clint's redemption.

Present brings Clint to Nora, who is happily celebrating Christmas with her husband and children, but Clint deduces that Present longs for a happy family life himself with Kimberly ("The Story of Your Life (Clint's Pitch)"). Present dismisses this (again interrupting that song), and instead shows him Joshua's horrified reaction to Wren's re-posting of his video. Present finally gets Clint to relive his sister's dying request to raise Wren, which Clint had refused, passing the responsibility onto their younger brother Owen.

Present prepares to leave Clint with Yet-To-Come, but Clint forces Present to confront his own fears about whether he was truly redeemed, considering Scrooge had only lived three more weeks after encountering the Ghosts. Clint convinces Present to take his retirement and return to Earth ("Unredeemable"). Soon after, the two wake up in Clint's apartment, and Present, now mortal, asks Kimberly out on a date ("The View from Here (Riverwalk)"). Clint is then intercepted by Yet-to-Come and shown glimpses of the future, including Joshua's suicide after the video Wren posted destroyed his reputation. The vision shakes Clint, and he runs away from the haunt but is intercepted by Past and Yet-To-Come, who force him back to Earth.

Returning to his apartment, Clint and Present race to stop Wren from posting the video. Just as they catch up to her, Kimberly stops them. She explains that she convinced Wren not to do it, then informs Clint that she's quitting. Present is jubilant and waits for Clint to receive his congratulations from the ghost crew, but is confused when they don’t arrive.

Clint explains that all he did was rectify a mistake and that he hasn't changed, but he tells Present that life is still worth trying and offers his friendship. Present, despondent and convinced he is unredeemable, jumps in front of an oncoming bus in order to return to his job in the afterlife. Clint shoves him out of the way, and just before the bus hits, time freezes, and the spirits arrive to congratulate Clint for achieving his redemption ("Do a Little Good"). When time resumes, however, the bus hits Clint, killing him. Carrie arrives shortly after to lead Clint into the afterlife, and Clint and his sister have an emotional reunion; however, he is reluctant to leave Present behind. Instead, he makes a proposal to Marley.

Several years later, Clint has assumed the role of the Ghost of Christmas Present and is in a relationship with Past. He is expanding the program to include other holidays, take on more perps every year, and has brought Carrie onboard as part of the staff. He also regularly visits Present, now going by Roberto, and Kimberly as they raise their two kids, revealing that they continue to work together redeeming souls. Wren has grown up and has been accepted into a masters program at Stanford ("That Christmas Morning Feelin' (Curtain Call)").

In a post-credit scene, it’s revealed that, at the Christmas tree convention, the hotel manager is the next "perp" chosen to be redeemed.

Cast
 Will Ferrell as Ebenezer Scrooge, the current Ghost of Christmas Present
 Ryan Reynolds as Clint Briggs
 Nico Tirozzi as young Clint Briggs
 Thomas P. Gillis as future Clint Briggs
 Octavia Spencer as Kimberly 
 Sunita Mani as Bonnie, the Ghost of Christmas Past
 Patrick Page as Jacob Marley
 Marlow Barkley as Wren / Young Carrie
 Loren G. Woods as the Ghost of Christmas Yet to Come
 Tracy Morgan as voice of Yet to Come
 Aimee Carrero as Nora
 Joe Tippett as Owen Briggs
 Andrea Anders as Carrie Briggs
 Jen Tullock as Wendy
 Lily Sullivan as Margot / HR Ghost
 P.J. Byrne as Mr. Alteli
 Rose Byrne as Karen Blansky
 Gavin Maddox Bergman as Oliver Twist
 Judi Dench as herself
 Jimmy Fallon as himself

Production
On September 20, 2019, it was announced that Daddy's Homes Sean Anders and John Morris were attached to write and direct the film, as well as produce under their production company Two Grown Men alongside Will Ferrell and Jessica Elbaum of Gloria Sanchez Productions and Ryan Reynolds and George Dewey of Maximum Effort. The following month, it was announced that Apple had won a competitive bidding war for the rights to the film. Also it was reported that more than $60 million was spent on talent for the film, which was later increased to $75 million.

Alongside the initial announcement, Ferrell and Reynolds were cast in main roles. Both actors earned $20 million for their parts in the film. On February 8, 2021, Octavia Spencer joined the cast, with Reynolds confirmed as the lead and Ferrell playing the role of the Ghost of Christmas Present. In June, Sunita Mani was cast as Ghost of Christmas Past.

Principal photography for the film began on July 6, 2021 in Boston, which stood in for Manhattan. On October 18, 2021, Reynolds announced that filming had wrapped.

Musical numbers

Release
Spirited had a limited theatrical release on November 11, 2022, followed by its digital release on Apple TV+ one week later, on November 18. A sing-along version was released theatrically on December 9, 2022.

Promotion
A 12-inch vinyl single featuring songs from Spirited was announced for Record Store Day's annual Black Friday event in 2022. It featured the song "That Christmas Mornin' Feeling" sung by Ferrell as the A-side and "Do a Little Good" sung by Ferrell and Reynolds as the B-side.

Reception
 

Writing for the Pittsburgh Tribune-Review, Rob Owen found the film was perhaps too long with too much happening, commenting: "If you’re re-telling the umpteenth version of the same story, it shouldn’t take more than two hours to do it regardless of the detours and small surprises plotted."

See also
 List of Christmas films
 Adaptations of A Christmas Carol

Notes

References

External links
 

American Christmas films
American ghost films
American musical films
Apple TV+ original films
Films about death
Films about the future
Films based on A Christmas Carol
Films directed by Sean Anders
Films produced by John Morris
Films produced by Will Ferrell
Films scored by Dominic Lewis
Films with screenplays by Sean Anders
Films with screenplays by John Morris
Gloria Sanchez Productions films
Musicals by Pasek and Paul
2020s musical films
2020s musical comedy films